The Luhe is a river in Lower Saxony, Germany. It runs through the Lüneburg Heath, and discharges into the Ilmenau and thus is part of the Elbe river system.

The entire catchment area of the Luhe has been heavily populated since the New Stone Age as evinced by sites like the monuments at Soderstorf and the Oldendorfer Totenstatt grave sites.

See also
List of rivers of Lower Saxony

References

Rivers of Lower Saxony
Rivers of Germany